K-1 Air Base, or Kaywan, is a former Iraqi Air Force base and military base in the Kirkuk Governorate of Iraq. It was captured by Coalition forces during Operation Iraqi Freedom in 2003, later served as the headquarters of the 12th Division of the Iraqi Army. In 2014 it was taken over by the Kurdish Peshmerga. On October 16, 2017, the base was taken back by Iraqi special forces during the Battle of Kirkuk.

History

K-1 was a primary air base for the Iraqi Air Force prior to Operation Iraqi Freedom.

Iraq war 2003–2011

It was used as a Contingency Operating Location by the United States Army after the 2003 U.S. invasion.

During the American presence in Iraq, U.S. and Iraqi forces used training centers at K1 as hubs for combined instruction between U.S. soldiers and various units of Iraqi Security Forces, including Iraqi Army infantry and route clearance units.

"This base will eventually be turned over from Location Command to the 12th Division," said Hall. “The 12th IA is planning on using the K1 facility to support a new tank regiment that is forming. The regiment is not on the ground yet, but it is in the working for the future.”

Soldiers of Company C, 1st Brigade Special Troops Battalion and 101st Brigade Support Battalion, 1st Advise and Assist Task Force, 1st Infantry Division, vacated and transferred control of Contingency Operating Location K1 to Iraq Security Forces, July 25, 2011.

2014–present
During the Northern Iraq offensive (August 2014) by the Islamic State of Iraq and the Levant, the 12th Division of the Iraqi Army, consisting of over 12,000 soldiers, fled this base. It was briefly captured by the Islamic State but they were swiftly pushed out by the Kurdish Peshmerga. During this period the base suffered looting both by IS and local residents.

The base has since hosted military personnel from multiple countries participating in the coalition war against the Islamic State of Iraq and the Levant, including Americans, Italians, French, Norwegians and others. There are reportedly American soldiers present at the base, training and advising Peshmerga.

On May 7, 2017, at least two soldiers were killed and six injured when multiple Islamic State suicide bombers attacked the base.

On October 16, 2017 the base was taken back from Kurdish control by Iraqi special forces during the Battle of Kirkuk (2017).

On December 27, 2019, around 7:20 pm, a rocket attack targeting the base killed a U.S. civilian contractor and wounded several American and Iraqi personnel. The attack was suspected to be conducted by Iran-backed militants of Kata'ib Hezbollah. That led to retaliatory airstrikes conducted by United States in Iraq and Syria, killing 25 Kata'ib Hezbollah militiamen.

The United States Army left the air base on March 29, 2020.

References

External links 
Spc. Justin Naylor, 2nd Brigade Combat Team, 1st Cavalry Division Public Affairs, Iraqi Army opens new center for engineers, November 13, 2009

Army installations of Iraq
Iraqi Air Force bases
Kirkuk Governorate